Yegor Sergeyevich Martynov (born August 15, 1990) is a Russian professional ice hockey defenceman. He is currently playing with HC Dynamo Moscow of the Kontinental Hockey League (KHL).

Playing career
Martynov made his Kontinental Hockey League (KHL) debut playing with Metallurg Novokuznetsk during the 2013–14 season.

During the 2014–15 season, Martynov was traded by Lokomotiv Yaroslavl, along with Alexei Kruchinin, to Traktor Chelyabinsk in exchange for the rights to Petri Kontiola on November 23, 2014.

Martynov extended his career in the KHL, leaving Metallurg Magnitogorsk after the 2020–21 season and signing a one-year contract with his seventh club, Torpedo Nizhny Novgorod, on 12 July 2021.

After a lone season with Torpedo Nizhny Novgorod, Martynov continued his journeyman career in signing a two-year contract with HC Dynamo Moscow, his eighth KHL club, on 3 May 2022.

References

External links

1990 births
Living people
Avangard Omsk players
HC Dynamo Moscow players
Lokomotiv Yaroslavl players
Metallurg Magnitogorsk players
Metallurg Novokuznetsk players
Russian ice hockey defencemen
HC Sibir Novosibirsk players
Torpedo Nizhny Novgorod players
Traktor Chelyabinsk players